Robin Greer is an American actress, noted for her roles in television soap operas.

She played Sydney Price in the daytime series Ryan's Hope before switching to prime time to play Dina Wells in Falcon Crest.

Greer co-authored The Hollywood Handbook: The Insiders' Guide to Success with Sarah Reinhardt and Kevin Dornan.  The book was published in September 1997 and is a guide to surviving in Hollywood, with advice on trends, career choices, lingo and places to meet celebrities.

Greer was close friends with Nicole Brown Simpson, ex-wife of O. J. Simpson.

Filmography

References

External links

American television actresses
American soap opera actresses
Living people
1960 births
21st-century American women